WDCJ (92.7 FM), known on air as "Majic 102.3 & 92.7," is an urban adult contemporary formatted radio station licensed to Prince Frederick, Maryland, and serving the southeastern Washington metropolitan area. The station's programming is a relay of WMMJ (102.3 FM) in Bethesda, Maryland

History
92.7 FM signed on August 1, 1971 as WESM, a local station serving Calvert County, Maryland with country music. Original owners George Gautney and Carl Jones sold the station to Mel Gollub's MJS Communications in 1973. As WMJS, the station continued as country at first, but later flipped to adult contemporary in 1985 and again to easy listening in 1987.

In 2000, Mega Communications bought the station. Under the new callsign WBZS-FM, it joined a simulcast with WBPS (94.3 FM, Warrenton, Virginia) to create a metro-wide network for its "La Nueva Mega" Spanish-language adult contemporary format. In 2005, the network flipped to Spanish oldies branded as "Mega Clasica".

Immediately after the sale, efforts began to build a low-powered station to return local service to Calvert County. WMJS-LP, taking the now-unused callsign, signed on in 2003.

Red Zebra Broadcasting, headed by Washington Redskins owner Daniel Snyder, purchased the two stations along with WKDL (730 AM, Alexandria, Virginia) in January 2006. Snyder's goal was a sports talk radio competitor to WTEM (980 AM). The three-station network was known as "Triple X ESPN Radio", with 92.7 FM gaining the WWXT callsign to match. Snyder bought WTEM itself in 2008, after which the network was simply known as "ESPN 980".

Snyder began selling his radio properties in 2017. WWXT was sold to Urban One on April 20; the station was flipped to a simulcast of WMMJ's urban adult contemporary format on May 1, with the new WDCJ callsign taking effect on the 19th.

References

External links
Official Website of Majic 102.3

Urban One stations
Radio stations established in 1971
DCJ
Urban adult contemporary radio stations in the United States
1971 establishments in Washington, D.C.
1971 establishments in Maryland
Prince Frederick, Maryland